Sinethemba Mjekula (born 16 October 1983) is a South African former cricketer. He played in 49 first-class and 31 List A cricket matches in domestic tournaments in South Africa between 2004 and 2013. He is now an umpire and has stood in matches in the 2018–19 CSA 3-Day Provincial Cup and the 2018–19 CSA Provincial One-Day Challenge.

References

External links
 

1983 births
Living people
South African cricketers
South African cricket umpires
Border cricketers
Eastern Province cricketers
KwaZulu-Natal Inland cricketers
Place of birth missing (living people)